Local elections were held in Romania in late May 2004 and a runoff for mayors in early June 2004.

In late May elections were held for:
 all the villages, communes, cities, and municipal councils (Local Councils), and the Sectors Local Councils of Bucharest;
 the 41 County Councils, and the Bucharest Municipal General Council;
 all the mayors;
 of the villages, cities, and municipalities;
 of the Sectors of Bucharest;
 The General Mayor of The Municipality of Bucharest.

In early June elections were held, on a runoff system, for all the mayor positions in which nobody received at least 50% of the votes in late May.

Electoral maps

References 

Local election, 2004
2004 elections in Romania
May 2004 events in Europe
June 2004 events in Europe
2004 in Romania